Euastacus is a genus of freshwater crayfish known as "spiny crayfish". They are found in the south-east of the Australian mainland, along with another genus of crayfish, Cherax. Both genera are members of the family Parastacidae, a family of freshwater crayfish restricted to the Southern Hemisphere.

Euastacus crayfish are distinguished from the smooth-shelled Cherax species by the short robust spikes on their claws and carapace, and frequently, their larger size. Many Euastacus species grow to a relatively large size, with the Murray River crayfish (Euastacus armatus) being the second largest freshwater crayfish species in the world. (The largest freshwater crayfish in the world is the Tasmanian giant freshwater crayfish (Astacopsis gouldi), found on the Australian island of Tasmania, and the genus Astacopsis is now known to be a very closely related sister genus to Euastacus.)

The genera Cherax and Euastacus continue a trend present in many Australian native freshwater fish genera of speciation into generalist lowland and specialist upland species. Generally, Cherax species inhabit lowland rivers at low to medium altitudes and swamps and ephemeral waters in inland areas of Australia including the Murray-Darling Basin. Conversely, Euastacus species are only found in permanent waters and generally inhabit upland rivers at medium to high altitudes in the Murray-Darling Basin as well as many easterly and southerly flowing coastal river systems. The partial exceptions to this are:
 the Murray River crayfish which was originally found along the entire length of the Murray River in addition to many upland habitats, and is still found in the middle reaches of the Murray River
 the Glenelg Spiny Crayfish (Eustacus bispinosus), found (or formerly found) in lowland areas of the Glenelg River system and Eight Mile Creek/Ewen Ponds system
 the Gippsland Crayfish (Euastacus kershawi), found in lowland areas of some streams in the Gippsland area.

Even when found in lowland habitats, these several more adaptable Euastacus crayfish are still highly dependent on reliable flows and good water quality, with good dissolved oxygen levels and low salinity.  In contrast to Cherax (yabby) species, Euastacus species are unable to survive drying of their habitats.

The genus Cherax has a far wider distribution than the genus Euastacus, and is found in many parts of Australia including south-western Australia. The genus Euastacus is restricted to the south-east of the Australian mainland. There is a high degree of endemism in Euastacus species in coastal river systems, with many species restricted to single river or creek catchment. Euastacus species occur in several upland reservoirs.

Euastacus species are extremely slow growing, long-lived (possibly 40+ years in some species), and late to reach sexual maturity. These biological characteristics make Euastacus species vulnerable to environmental disturbances and essentially unable to support to catch-and-kill fisheries.

Species
Of the 50 species in the genus Euastacus, 17 are on the IUCN Red List as critically endangered (CR), 17 are endangered (EN), 5 vulnerable (VU), 1 near threatened (NT), 8 least concern (LC) and 1 is data deficient (DD):

Euastacus armatus (Von Martens, 1866) 
Euastacus australasiensis (H. Milne-Edwards, 1837) 
Euastacus balanesis Morgan, 1988 
Euastacus bidawalis Morgan, 1986 
Euastacus bindal Morgan, 1989 
Euastacus bispinosus Clark, 1936 
Euastacus brachythorax Riek, 1969 
Euastacus clarkae Morgan, 1997 
Euastacus claytoni Riek, 1969 
Euastacus crassus Riek, 1969 
Euastacus dalagarbe Coughran, 2005 
Euastacus dangadi Morgan, 1997 
Euastacus diharawalus Morgan, 1997 
Euastacus diversus Riek, 1969 
Euastacus eungella Morgan, 1988 
Euastacus fleckeri (Watson, 1953) 
Euastacus gamilaroi Morgan, 1997 
Euastacus girurmulayn Coughran, 2005 
Euastacus gumar Morgan, 1997 
Euastacus guruhgi Coughran, 2005 
Euastacus guwinus Morgan, 1997 
Euastacus hirsutus (McCulloch, 1917) 
Euastacus hystricosus Riek, 1951 
Euastacus jagabar Coughran, 2005 
Euastacus jagara Morgan, 1988 
Euastacus kershawi Smith, 1912 
Euastacus maccai McCormack & Coughran, 2008 
Euastacus maidae (Riek, 1956) 
Euastacus mirangudjin Coughran, 2002 
Euastacus monteithorum Morgan, 1989 
Euastacus morgani Coughran & McCormack, 2011
Euastacus neodiversus Riek, 1969 
Euastacus neohirsutus Riek, 1956 
Euastacus pilosus Coughran & Leckie, 2007 
Euastacus polysetosus Riek, 1951 
Euastacus reductus Riek, 1969 
Euastacus rieki Morgan, 1997 
Euastacus robertsi Monroe, 1977 
Euastacus setosus (Riek, 1956) 
Euastacus simplex Riek, 1956 
Euastacus spinichelatus Morgan, 1997 
Euastacus spinifer (Heller, 1865) 
Euastacus sulcatus Riek, 1951 
Euastacus suttoni Clark, 1941 
Euastacus urospinosus (Riek, 1956) 
Euastacus valentulus Riek, 1951 
Euastacus wiowuru Morgan, 1986 
Euastacus yanga Morgan, 1997 
Euastacus yarraensis (McCoy, 1888) 
Euastacus yigara Short & Davie, 1993

References

External links

 Giant Spiny Crayfish (Euastacus spinifer) video on Youtube
  Gippsland Spiny Crayfish (Euastacus kershawi) video on Youtube

 
Parastacidae
Freshwater crustaceans of Australia
Crustacean genera